The canton of Annecy-1 is an administrative division of the Haute-Savoie department, southeastern France. It was created at the French canton reorganisation which came into effect in March 2015. Its seat is in Annecy.

It consists of the following communes:

Annecy (partly) 
La Balme-de-Sillingy
Choisy
Lovagny
Mésigny
Nonglard
Poisy
Sallenôves
Sillingy

References

Cantons of Haute-Savoie